Thamil Isai Kalaamanram (TIKM) is a non-profit organization dedicated to promoting carnatic music and bharathanatyam dance in Ontario, Canada, headquartered in Toronto. Founded in 1992, this Toronto-based organization has grown to become the widely accepted conservatory of South Indian music and dance, servicing over 160 classical music teachers in Canada.

See also
Carnatic music
Bharatanatyam
Mridangam
Veena
Violin

External links
 Thamil Isai Kalaamanram

Carnatic music
Vocational education
Music schools in Canada